AFFA may refer to:

Angels Forever, Forever Angels, a slogan of the Hells Angels Motorcycle Club
Association of Football Federations of Azerbaijan
Formerly the department of Agriculture, Fisheries, and Forestry - Australia, now Department of Agriculture (Australia, 2019–20)